YSCC may refer to:
 YSCC Yokohama, a Japanese multisports club based in Yokohama
 The ICAO code for Scott Creek Airport, an airstrip in South Australia